Sundown: The Vampire in Retreat is a 1989 American Western comedy horror film directed by Anthony Hickox and starring David Carradine, Bruce Campbell, Morgan Brittany, and Deborah Foreman. It was written by Hickox and John Burgess.

Its only public screenings were at film festivals in Seattle and Palm Springs, as well as at Cannes. Released in 1991 on VHS and in 2008 on DVD, it has earned a cult following.

Synopsis 
Under the leadership of the ancient Jozek Mardulak, a colony of vampires seek a peaceful life in the desolate desert town of Purgatory. Key to the transition is repairing the town's artificial blood factory. Mardulak summons the human designer of the plant, who brings his wife and two young daughters along for what he thinks will be a pleasant desert vacation.

Ethan Jefferson is a vampire who wants to return to hunting and feasting on humans. Soon, the plant manager and his family are caught up in a civil war as Jefferson organizes a revolution.

In the midst of the vampire civil war a young descendant of the Van Helsing family arrives intent on destroying all vampires.

Cast

 David Carradine as Count Jozek Mardulak
 Bruce Campbell  as Robert Van Helsing
 Morgan Brittany as Sarah Harrison
 Jim Metzler as David Harrison
 Maxwell Caulfield as Shane Dennis
 Deborah Foreman as Sandy White
 M. Emmet Walsh as Mort Bisby
 John Ireland as Ethan Jefferson
 Dana Ashbrook as Jack
 John Hancock as Quinton Canada
 Marion Eaton as Anna Trotsberg
 Dabbs Greer as Otto Trotsberg
 Bert Remsen as Milt Bisby
 Sunshine Parker as Merle Bisby
 Helena Carroll as Madge
 Elizabeth Gracen as Alice
 Christopher Bradley as Chaz
 Kathy MacQuarrie Martin as Burgundy
 Jack Eiseman as Nigel
 George Buck Flower as Bailey
 Erin Gourlay as Juliet Harrison
 Vanessa Pierson as Gwendolyn Harrison
 Brendan Hughes as James
 Gerardo Mejia as Pucci
 Mike Najiar as Ramon
 Phillip Simon as Pierre

Production
Parts of the film were shot at Moab, Spanish Valley, Thompson Springs, Hittle Bottom and Arches National Park in Utah.

Reception
In Creature Feature, the movie received 3 out of 5 stars, noting that it was infused with cinematic vitality  TV Guide similarly gave the movie 3 out of 5 stars, finding the movie to be enjoyable, but that the ending collapses under its own cleverness. Entertainment Weekly gave the movie a C−, finding it to be anemic.

References

External links
 
 
 
 
 TV Guide's review of the film

1989 horror films
1989 films
1980s comedy horror films
1980s Western (genre) comedy films
1980s Western (genre) horror films
American vampire films
American supernatural horror films
American comedy horror films
Films directed by Anthony Hickox
Films scored by Richard Stone (composer)
Films set in deserts
Vestron Pictures films
Films shot in Utah
American Western (genre) comedy films
American Western (genre) horror films
1980s English-language films
1980s American films